Perlesta is a genus of common stoneflies in the family Perlidae. There are more than 30 described species in Perlesta.

Species
These 33 species belong to the genus Perlesta:

 Perlesta adena Stark, 1989
 Perlesta armitagei Grubbs & DeWalt, 2018
 Perlesta baumanni Stark, 1989
 Perlesta beatyi Kondratieff, Zuellig & Lenat, 2011
 Perlesta bjostadi Kondratieff & Lenat, 2006
 Perlesta bolukta Stark, 1989
 Perlesta browni Stark, 1989
 Perlesta chaoi Wu, 1948
 Perlesta cinctipes (Banks, 1905)
 Perlesta cranshawi Kondratieff & Kirchner, 2006
 Perlesta dakota Kondratieff & Baumann, 1999
 Perlesta decipiens (Walsh, 1862)
 Perlesta durfeei Kondratieff, Zuellig & Kirchner, 2008
 Perlesta ephelida Grubbs & DeWalt, 2012
 Perlesta etnieri Kondratieff & Kirchner, 2002
 Perlesta frisoni Banks, 1948
 Perlesta fusca Poulton & Stewart, 1991
 Perlesta georgiae Kondratieff, Zuellig & Lenat, 2008
 Perlesta golconda DeWalt & Stark, 1998
 Perlesta lagoi Stark, 1989
 Perlesta leathermani Kondratieff & Zuellig, 2006
 Perlesta mihucorum Kondratieff & Myers, 2011
 Perlesta nelsoni Stark, 1989 (pale stone)
 Perlesta nitida Banks, 1948 (tiny stone)
 Perlesta ouabache Grubbs & DeWalt, 2011
 Perlesta placida (Hagen, 1861)
 Perlesta puttmanni Kondratieff & Kirchner, 2003
 Perlesta roblei Kondratieff & Kirchner, 2003
 Perlesta shawnee Grubbs, 2005
 Perlesta shubuta Stark, 1989
 Perlesta spatulata Wu, 1938
 Perlesta teaysia Kirchner & Kondratieff, 1997
 Perlesta xube Stark & Rhodes, 1997 (Pawnee stone)

References

Further reading

External links

 

Perlidae
Articles created by Qbugbot